Bungmual is a village in a Churachandpur district of Manipur, India. It is further sub-divided into "Veng", some of them are Lamlian Veng, Lai Veng, Hausa Veng, New Lane, Colony Veng, Siloam Veng and Zoar Veng,

As per the 2011 Census there are 707 houses with a total population of 4441 of which 2167 are males while 2274 are females. Bungmual has a higher literacy rate compared to Manipur. The literacy rate is 93.53% compared to 76.94% of Manipur.

Schools 
 Hermon English School
 Lalpuithluaii Foundation School

Post office 
Bungmual Post Office is a Branch Office. Pin code is 795006 (New Lamka). or 795128 (Churachandpur)

References

External links 
 Indiatvnews

Villages in Churachandpur district